The IZh-58 (ИЖ-58) is a Soviet double-barreled shotgun.

History 
IZh-58 was designed by L. I. Pugachev (Л. И. Пугачев), in last months of 1958 first shotguns were made.

Since 1961, a new varnish with improved characteristics has been used to protect the wooden parts of the gun. As a result, since January 1961, the price of one standard IZh-58 was 60 roubles. 

More than 1.36 million IZh-58 hunting shotguns were produced in all four standard variants. In addition, one experimental sample of lightweight IZh-58 shotgun was made with aluminium alloy details.

It was replaced by IZh-43 model in late 1980s. The last IZh-58MAE shotgun was made in 1987.

Design 
IZh-58 is a side by side smoothbore shotgun. The detachable barrels are made from heat-treated 50RA steel (сталь 50PA)

The barrels have chokes at the muzzle end.

It has a walnut, birch or beech shoulder stock and fore-end

Variants 
 IZh-58 (ИЖ-58) - first model In total, 642,000 IZh-58 shotguns were made in 1958-1971 and 73 thousands of them were sold to other countries
 IZh-58M (ИЖ-58М) - second model, since 1970 In total, 235,000 IZh-58M shotguns were made in 1970-1976 and 115 thousands of them were sold to other countries
 IZh-58MA (ИЖ-58МА) - third model, since 1975. It is equipped with new safety mechanism
 IZh-58MAE (ИЖ-58МАЕ) - last model, since 1977. It is equipped with new safety mechanism and ejector
 IZh-58MA-20M (ИЖ-58MA-20М) - export variant (IZh-58MA with 670-680mm barrels chambered in 20/76 mm Magnum shotgun shells)

Users 

 
  - is allowed as civilian hunting weapon
 
  - is allowed as civilian hunting weapon
  - the import was allowed

References

Sources 
 Охотничье двуствольное ружьё ИЖ-58 // Охотничье, спортивное огнестрельное оружие. Каталог. М., 1958. стр.36-37
 Двуствольное охотничье ружьё ИЖ-58 // Спортивно-охотничье оружие и патроны. Бухарест, "Внешторгиздат", 1965. стр.26-27
 Отечественные ружья // журнал «Охота и охотничье хозяйство», № 1, 1965. стр.36-37
 Э. Штейнгольд. Ружьё ИЖ-58М // журнал «Охота и охотничье хозяйство», № 7, 1973. стр.28
 Universal/Baikal Model IJ-58M double-barrel shotgun // "American Rifleman", January 1977
 Отечественное охотничье оружие. ИЖ-58 // журнал «Охота и охотничье хозяйство», № 3, 1981. стр.33
 М. М. Блюм, И. Б. Шишкин. Охотничье ружьё. М., «Лесная промышленность», 1983. стр.85
 Ижевское оружие. Том 1. Ижевские ружья / Н. Л. Изметинский, Л. Е. Михайлов. - Ижевск, издательство Удмуртского университета, 1995. - 247 стр. : ил.

Double-barreled shotguns of the Soviet Union
Izhevsk Mechanical Plant products
Weapons and ammunition introduced in 1958